The Iraq Historic Allegations Team (IHAT) is a unit set up by the British government in March 2010 to investigate allegations of abuse and torture by British soldiers in Iraq. Much of these have focused on three interrogation sites near Basra operated by the Joint Forward Interrogation Team (JFIT) between March 2003 and December 2008. The inquiry was established in November 2010 after 146 Iraqi men said they had been tortured.

The unit is led by retired senior civilian police detective, Mark Warwick, and is made up of Royal Navy Police officers and ex-civilian police detectives and will soon be up to its full complement of 145 staff. In January 2013 G4S subsidiary G4S Policing Solutions lost its contract to provide 40 former police officers for the inquiry, and was replaced by Police Skills, a subsidiary of Red Snapper Group, who will provide 100 former detectives.

In a judicial review the Court of Appeal ruled in November 2011 that the involvement of the General Police Duties branch of the Royal Military Police (RMP) "substantially compromised" the inquiry because members of the unit had participated in detentions in Iraq. The armed forces minister, Nick Harvey, responded by announcing in March 2012 that the RMP staff would be reassigned and replaced by Royal Navy Police personnel by 1 April 2012.

Lawyers representing people alleging that they have been tortured applied for another judicial review in May 2012 to examine the claim that the Royal Navy Police are not sufficiently independent since they also took part in interrogations, and that abuses were so systemic and widespread that only a public inquiry will satisfy the UK's human rights obligations.

The case started on 29 January 2013 and a judgement was handed down by Mr Justice Silber on 24 May 2013. In this judgement it was stated that IHAT has now been structured in such a way that it can independently carry out its investigative and prosecutorial functions. It also ruled that the decision of the Secretary of State to refuse to order an overarching public enquiry could not be called into question and said more should be done to address wider systemic issues. A possible solution—coronial-type inquests once criminal proceedings are complete in a particular case, or once it is evident that particular allegations will not lead to a criminal prosecution—was suggested for consideration by the Secretary of State.

In 2016 Martin Jerrold, managing director of the Red Snapper Group (RSG) was called as a witness to an oral evidence session by a parliament select committee.  A subsequent Daily Telegraph article highlighted the profits made by the company which has contracts worth £4.8 million a year and its apparent ineffectiveness in that over its six years of existence it has yet to produce a single successful prosecution. Its 127 staff can be paid through limited companies potentially reducing tax.  RSG confirmed all of its workers were inside IR35 and therefore made the correct levels of income tax and National Insurance returns.  Furthermore Martin Jerrold provided evidence in the form of the engagement contract with the MOD which clearly set out RSG was contracted to provide agency workers.  These workers worked under the direction, supervision and control of nominated MOD staff.  RSG did not provide an operational service feature.  They were for all intents and purposes the recruitment, training and HR function of the team.

In 2017, Defence Secretary Michael Fallon announced that the investigations would be shut down within months after MPs called it an "unmitigated failure." According to the Defence Committee report, IHAT had taken up over 3,500 allegations of abuse despite most not having any credible evidence. The report found failings in the conduct of investigations and concluded that those being investigated had suffered unacceptable stress, had their lives put on hold and careers damaged.

References

External links
Official site
Completed cases by the IHAT
 

2000s in Iraq
Human rights in Iraq
Iraq–United Kingdom relations
Iraq War
Iraq War casualties
Military history of Iraq
Military of the United Kingdom
Military prisoner abuse scandals
Torture in Iraq
Torture in the United Kingdom
United Kingdom intelligence community
War crimes in Iraq
Violence against men in Asia